The 1911 Oregon Webfoots football team represented the University of Oregon in the 1911 college football season. It was the Webfoots' 19th overall season and they competed as an independent. The team was led by head coach Bill Warner, in his second year, and played their home games at Kincaid Field in Eugene and at Multnomah Field in Portland.

Oregon did not meet rival Oregon Agricultural of Corvallis this season and finished with three wins and two losses (3–2).

The unexpected death of guard Virgil Noland caused the cancellation of the Idaho game on November 25.

Schedule

References

Oregon
Oregon Ducks football seasons
Oregon Webfoots football